Zahrah the Windseeker is a young adult fantasy  novel and the debut novel of Nigerian American writer Nnedi Okorafor, published in September 2005. It incorporates myths and folklore and culture of Nigeria.  It is the winner of the 2008 Wole Soyinka Prize for Literature in Africa.

Plot
The novel takes place in the fictional northern kingdom of Ooni located in the planet Ginen where technology is made using plants. Children who are born with Dada (dreadlocks) are despised because of an old rumor about them possessing magical abilities. The kingdom is enclaved by the forbidden greeny jungle.

Zahrah Tsami is a thirteen years old  who lives with her parents, she was born dada, which means vines grow among her hair and is a subject of ridicule among her peers, except for her best friend, Dari. Zharah discovers her ability to fly as a windseeker but she is afraid of heights, so it makes her feel a bit anxious about it.

During one of their secret trips to the greeny jungle to practice and explore the jungle with the aid of a digibook written by explorers, Dari is bitten by a snake and falls into a deep coma. The doctor prescribed a serum made from an unfertilized Elgort (huge dinosaur like creature) egg as the only cure of his Dari’s ailment.

Zahrah escapes from home with the digibook and her compass to the forbidden greeny jungle in order to get an Elgort egg meeting the annoying shinning pink frog and others who advised her to go back home. While in the jungle Zahrah discovers that the chapter in the digibook containing information about the Elgort is broken and she cannot access it. 

After staying in the village of the gorilla where technology is forbidden she is told that only the rude shinning pink frog can tell her how to get an elgort egg, she ventures into the forest again until she is met by Nsibidi, a windseeker who has come to take her home. Zahrah runs, and comes across the Pink frog who tells her how to get the egg.

She finally succeeds in stealing an unfertilized eglort egg and is able to fly just before the elgort catches her. Zahrah heads back home where she reunites with her parents and the egg is used to create the serum which awakened Dari.

Characters 
Zharah Tsami:  the protagonist is a 13 years old girl,  The kids at school taunt Zahrah for being a witch who doesn't deserve the popular Dari because of her dada and is desperate to get the unfertilized elgort egg to cure her friend Dari. She is shy and quiet and learns to take responsibility while in the forbidden Greeny jungle.
Dari: Dari is Zarah's only friend and a popular kid at school. he is brave and curious to get explore the forbidden greeny jungle after reading a digibook about the jungle where he is later bitten by a snake and falls into a deep coma only to be awakened after receiving the Elgort Serum.
Nsibidi: Nsibidi is a windseeker who sells charm at the Dark market. She mentors Zarah here for a brief moment and motivates her in building her ability to fly. She is biracial as her mother is from Earth.
The frog: The shinny pink frog with gold speckles is a rude annoying frog who has the answer to all questions and helps Zarah in getting an Elgort egg.
Obax: the king of the gorilla who accommodates Zarah in the gorilla town where technology is forbidden.
Papa Grip: the leader of the small town where Zarah lives.

Awards
The Wole Soyinka Prize for Literature in Africa, won
2005 Carl Brandon Parallax and Kindred Awards, shortlisted
Garden State Teen Book Award, finalist
Golden Duck Award, finalist

See also 
The Shadow Speaker

References

External links
Zahrah the Windseeker at the author's website
 

2005 American novels
American young adult novels
Nigerian fantasy novels
Young adult fantasy novels
American fantasy novels
Works based on folklore
Novels set in Nigeria
Houghton Mifflin books
English-language novels
Novels by Nnedi Okorafor
2005 Nigerian novels